Erik Ohlsson may refer to:

 Erik Ohlsson (musician) (born 1975), Swedish guitarist
 Erik Ohlsson (sport shooter) (1884–1980), Swedish sport shooter